Middlefork Township is a township in Vermilion County, Illinois, USA.  As of the 2010 census, its population was 1,458 and it contained 628 housing units.

History
Middlefork Township was one of the eight townships created in 1851 and included all the land that later became Butler and Ford Townships.

The first settlers in the township were Samuel Partlow and his wife and four sons, who arrived from Kentucky in 1829.  A harsh winter caused the loss of all their cattle, and there was little game available for food; Samuel died that year and the family returned to Kentucky.  However, the next year, they came back again.

Geography
The streams of Bean Creek, Bluegrass Creek and Knights Branch run through this township.

Cities and towns
 Potomac

Unincorporated towns
 Armstrong

Extinct towns
 Blue Grass
 Ellis

Adjacent townships
 Butler Township (north)
 Ross Township (east)
 South Ross Township (east)
 Blount Township (southeast)
 Pilot Township (south)
 Compromise Township, Champaign County (west)
 Kerr Township, Champaign County (west)

Cemeteries
The township contains seven cemeteries: Ingersoll, Old Partlow, Old Sowdowsky, Outton Family, Partlow, Potomac and Wallace Chapel.

Major highways
  U.S. Route 136
  Illinois State Route 49

Demographics

References
 U.S. Board on Geographic Names (GNIS)
 United States Census Bureau cartographic boundary files

External links
 US-Counties.com
 City-Data.com
 Illinois State Archives

Townships in Vermilion County, Illinois
Townships in Illinois